John Hawke may refer to:

Sir Anthony Hawke (John Anthony Hawke, 1869–1941), English politician and judge
Johnny Hawke (1925–1992), Australian rugby league footballer
John D. Hawke Jr. (1933–2022), U.S. Department of Treasury official

See also
John Hawk (disambiguation)
John Hawkes (disambiguation)
John Hawks (disambiguation)
St. John Hawke, fictional character from the American television series Airwolf